Glyptotermes ceylonicus, is a species of damp wood termite of the genus Glyptotermes. It is endemic to high elevations Sri Lanka. It is a pest of dead and decaying wood of Hevea, Theobroma, Ficus, and ''Acacia species.

References

External links
Glyptotermes chiraharitae n. sp., a new dampwood termite species (Isoptera: Kalotermitidae) from India

Glyptotermes
Insects described in 1911
Invertebrates of Sri Lanka